Romero Regales (born 7 November 1986) is a Curaçaoan professional footballer who plays as a forward for Bocholt in the Belgian Division 2.

International career
Regales made his debut for the Curaçao national team in a qualification match for the 2018 World Cup against Montserrat on 27 March 2015.

References

1986 births
Living people
People from Sittard
Dutch people of Curaçao descent
Curaçao footballers
Dutch footballers
Footballers from Limburg (Netherlands)
Association football forwards
Curaçao international footballers
Fortuna Sittard players
K. Patro Eisden Maasmechelen players
Lommel S.K. players
Oud-Heverlee Leuven players
FC Den Bosch players
2014 Caribbean Cup players
Eerste Divisie players
Challenger Pro League players
Belgian Pro League players
Belgian Third Division players
Dutch expatriate sportspeople in Belgium
Dutch expatriate footballers
Expatriate footballers in Belgium
Curaçao expatriate footballers
Curaçao expatriate sportspeople in Belgium